The 1997-98 Four Hills Tournament took place at the four traditional venues of Oberstdorf, Garmisch-Partenkirchen, Innsbruck and Bischofshofen, located in Germany and Austria, between 29 December 1997 and 6 January 1998.

Results

Overall

References

External links 
  

Four Hills Tournament
1997 in ski jumping
1998 in ski jumping
1997 in German sport
1998 in German sport
1998 in Austrian sport